= Chetang Ridge =

Named ridge in Alberta, Canada

Coordinates: 53.18331°N 119.06917°W

Chetang Ridge is a ridge in Alberta, Canada.

Chetang is a name derived from the Stoney language meaning "hawk".

Chetang Ridge (2 697m/8 848 ft a.s.l.) is a mountain in the Rocky Mountains in Canada. The prominence is 232m/761 ft.
